= Nachane =

- Census town
- Location in Maharashtra, India
- Coordinates: 17.0019°N 73.3293°E
- Country: India
- State: Maharashtra
- District: Ratnagiri

Population (2001)
  - Total: 9,236

Languages
  - Official: Marathi
- Time zone: UTC+5:30 (IST)

Nachane is a census town in Ratnagiri district in the Indian state of Maharashtra.

== Demographics ==
As of 2001 India census, Nachane had a population of 9236. Males constitute 52% of the population and females 48%. Nachane has an average literacy rate of 79%, higher than the national average of 59.5%: male literacy is 82%, and female literacy is 76%. In Nachane, 12% of the population is under 6 years of age.
